Acanthodactylus grandis, commonly called the giant fringe-fingered lizard, is a species of lizard in the family Lacertidae. The species is endemic to Western Asia.

Geographic range
A. grandis is found in Iran, Iraq, Jordan, Lebanon, Saudi Arabia, and Syria.

Reproduction
A. grandis is oviparous.

References

Further reading
Boulenger GA (1909). "Description of a new Lizard of the Genus Acanthodactylus from Syria". Annals and Magazine of Natural History, Eighth Series 4: 188–189. (Acanthodactylus grandis, new species). 
Salvador, Alfredo (1982). "A revision of the lizards of the genus Acanthodactylus (Sauria: Lacertidae)". Bonner Zoologische Monographien (16): 1–167. (Acanthodactylus grandis, pp. 110–113, Figures 66–68, Map 22). (in English, with an abstract in German).

Acanthodactylus
Reptiles described in 1909
Taxa named by George Albert Boulenger